Once In A Lifetime is a live album by Scottish Celtic rock band Runrig. It was released in 1988.

A review from Allmusic.com called it one of the best live albums ever: "Capturing the band in its best milieu — live — Once In A Lifetime is arguably one of the ten best live albums ever, if the test of a live album is the effect a band has on its audience that particular night. Alternately exhilarating and soul-stirring, its highlight is a rendition of Loch Lomond that has to be heard to be believed."

Track listing
 "Dance Called America" – 5:08
 "Protect and Survive" – 4:16
 "Chì Mi'n Geamhradh" ("I See The Winter") – 4:09
 "Rocket to the Moon" – 5:01
 "Going Home" – 4:20
 "Cnoc Na Fèille" ("The Hill at the Market Stance") – 5:23
 "'S Tu Mo Leannan" ("You Are My Love") / Nightfall On Marsco – 3:26
 "Skye" – 6:03
 "Loch Lomond" – 6:24
 "Hearts of Olden Glory" – 2:14

Personnel
Iain Bayne - drums
Malcolm Jones - electric guitar, vocals
Calum MacDonald - percussion, vocals
Rory Macdonald - bass guitar, vocals
Donnie Munro - lead vocals, acoustic guitar
Peter Wishart - keyboards

External links
 Runrig's official website

Runrig albums
1988 live albums
Chrysalis Records live albums
Scottish Gaelic music